Jacques Witta (born 22 April 1934) is a French film editor who began working in motion picture editing in the late 1950s. During his career, he has edited more than 60 feature films and has worked with noted French film directors such as Claude Berri and Jean Becker but is best known for his collaboration with Krzysztof Kieślowski which began with The Double Life of Véronique, and continued on Three Colors: Blue and Three Colors: Red.  He was also the editor of Harrison's Flowers, which was released by Universal Pictures in the US theatrically.

Jacques Witta won the César Award for Best Film Editing on two occasions. He won in 1984 for L'Eté meurtrier (One Deadly Summer) and again in 1994 for Trois couleurs: Bleu (Three Colors: Blue).

Selected filmography

 1997 : Messieurs les enfants
 2007 : Conversations with My Gardener
 2008 : Love Me No More
 2014 : Get Well Soon

References
McGrath, Declan. Screencraft: Editing & Post-Production. Rotovision (October 2002) .

French film editors
Living people
1934 births